Millionaires is a lost 1926 American comedy film directed by Herman C. Raymaker and written by Edward Clark, C. Graham Baker and Raymond L. Schrock. It is based on the 1923 novel The Inevitable Millionaires by E. Phillips Oppenheim. The film stars George Sidney, Louise Fazenda, Vera Gordon, Nat Carr, Helene Costello and Arthur Lubin. The film was released by Warner Bros. on October 1, 1926.

The film version switched the novel's setting from London to New York's East Side where a struggling Jewish tailor suddenly makes a fortune in oil stock and attempts to move up in the world socially with his newfound wealth.

Cast       
George Sidney as Meyer Rubens
Louise Fazenda as Reba, Esther's Sister
Vera Gordon as Esther Rubens
Nat Carr as Maurice
Helene Costello as Ida
Arthur Lubin as Lew
Jane Winton as Lottie
Otto Hoffman as Detective
William H. Strauss as Helper in Meyer's Tailor Shop

References

External links
 

1926 films
1920s English-language films
Silent American comedy films
1926 comedy films
Warner Bros. films
American silent feature films
American black-and-white films
Lost American films
1926 lost films
Lost comedy films
Films based on British novels
Films set in New York City
Films directed by Herman C. Raymaker
1920s American films